The Order of Arts and Letters of Spain is a Civil Order of Merit of Spain.  Established 24 July 2008, it is awarded to individuals and other entities, both Spanish and foreign, who have distinguished themselves in spreading the culture and image of Spain, through active participation in or work in related fields of literary or artistic creation.

The Order of Arts and Letters of Spain is granted by the King of Spain by Royal Decree, from the nominations of the Ministry of Education, Culture and Sport or other department responsible for cultural action.  Before granting the order to a foreign recipient, the Ministry of Foreign Affairs is consulted.  The order is presented by the head of the Ministry for culture.

This order has a single category and is purely honorary and carries no monetary reward with its presentation.  The order is regulated by Royal Decree 1320/2008, and was initiated by César Antonio Molina, who was then serving as the Minister of Culture.

Recipients

References

Arts and Letters
Order of Arts and Letters of Spain recipients